The 2028 EHF European Women's Handball Championship, commonly referred to as the EHF EURO 2028, will be the 18th edition of the EHF European Women's Handball Championship, the biennial international women's handball championship of Europe organized by EHF.

Bid process

Bidding timeline
The bidding timeline was as follows:

Bids
On 11 May 2021 it was announced that the following nations sent in an official expression of interest: 
 ,  &

Host selection 
As only the Scandinavian bid remained it was unanimously selected at the 14th EHF Extraordinary Congress on 20 November 2021.

Qualified teams 

1 Bold indicates champion for that year. Italic indicates host for that year.

References

Weblinks 
 Bid website of the European Handball Federation

European Women's Handball Championship
2028 in sports
European Championship, Women, 2028
European Championship, Women, 2028
European Championship, Women, 2028
European Women's